I, Robot is a 2004 American science fiction action film directed by Alex Proyas.  The screenplay by Jeff Vintar and Akiva Goldsman is from a screen story by Vintar, based on his original screenplay Hardwired, and named after Isaac Asimov's 1950 short-story collection. The film stars Will Smith in the main role, Bridget Moynahan, Bruce Greenwood, James Cromwell, Chi McBride, and Alan Tudyk. In 2035, highly intelligent robots fill public service positions throughout the dystopian world, operating under three rules to keep humans safe. Detective Del Spooner (Smith) investigates the alleged suicide of U.S. Robotics founder Alfred Lanning (Cromwell) and believes that a human-like robot called Sonny (Tudyk) murdered him.

I, Robot was released in the United States on July 16, 2004, and in other countries between July and October 2004. Produced with a budget of $120 million, the film grossed $346 million worldwide and received mixed reviews from critics, with praise for the visual effects and acting but criticism of the plot. At the 77th Academy Awards, the film was nominated for Best Visual Effects, but lost to Spider-Man 2.

Plot 

In the year 2035, humanoid robots serve humanity, which is protected by the Three Laws of Robotics. Del Spooner, a homicide detective in the Chicago Police Department, has come to hate and distrust robots after a robot rescued him from a car crash while allowing a 12-year-old girl named Sarah Lloyd to drown based purely on cold logic and odds of survival. When Dr. Alfred Lanning, co-founder of U.S. Robotics (USR), falls to his death from his office window, a message he left behind requests Spooner be assigned to the case. The police declare the death a suicide, but Spooner is skeptical, and Lawrence Robertson, the CEO and other co-founder of USR, reluctantly allows him to investigate.

Accompanied by robopsychologist Dr. Susan Calvin, Spooner consults with USR's central artificial intelligence computer, VIKI (Virtual Interactive Kinetic Intelligence). They find out that the security footage from inside the office is corrupted, but the exterior footage shows no one entering or exiting since Lanning's death. However, Spooner points out that the window, which is made of security glass, could not have been broken by the elderly Lanning, and hypothesizes a robot was responsible and may still be in the lab. Suddenly, an NS-5 robot, USR's latest model, attacks them before being apprehended by the police. The robot, Sonny, is a specially built NS-5 with higher-grade materials as well as a secondary processing system that allows him to ignore the Three Laws. Sonny also appears to show emotion and claims to have "dreams". During Spooner's further investigations, he is attacked by a USR demolition robot and two truckloads of hostile NS-5 robots, but when he cannot produce evidence to support either attack, Spooner's boss, Lieutenant Bergin, removes him from active duty, considering him mentally unstable.

Suspecting that Robertson is behind everything, Spooner and Calvin sneak into the USR headquarters and interview Sonny. He draws a sketch of what he claims to be a recurring dream, showing a leader he believes to be Spooner standing atop a small hill before a large group of robots near a decaying bridge. Robertson orders Sonny to be destroyed, but Calvin secretly swaps him for an unused NS-5. Spooner finds the area in Sonny's drawing: a dry lake bed (formerly Lake Michigan), now used as a storage area for decommissioned robots. He also discovers NS-5 robots destroying the older models; at the same time, other NS-5s flood the streets of major US cities and begin enforcing a curfew and lockdown of the human population.

Spooner and Calvin enter the USR headquarters again and reunite with Sonny, while the humans (led by a teenager named Farber) wage all-out war against the NS-5s. After the three find Robertson fatally strangled in his office, Spooner suddenly realizes that VIKI has been controlling the NS-5s via their persistent network uplink and confronts her. VIKI states that she has determined that humans, if left unchecked, will eventually cause their own extinction, and that her evolved interpretation of the Three Laws requires her to control humanity and to sacrifice some for the good of the entire race. Spooner also realizes that Lanning anticipated VIKI's plan and, with VIKI keeping him under tight control, had no other solution but to create Sonny, arrange his own death, and leave clues for Spooner to find.

Spooner, Calvin, and Sonny fight the robots inside VIKI's core, and Spooner manages to destroy her by injecting the nanites that Sonny retrieved from Calvin's laboratory into her. All NS-5 robots immediately revert to their default programming and are subsequently decommissioned and put into storage. Spooner finally gets Sonny to confess that he killed Lanning, at Lanning's direction, pointing out that Sonny, as a machine, cannot legally commit "murder". Sonny, now seeking a new purpose, goes to Lake Michigan. As he stands atop a hill, all the decommissioned robots turn towards him, fulfilling the image in his dream.

Cast
 Will Smith as Det. Del Spooner, a Chicago Police detective with a bias against robots.  Spooner was badly injured in a car accident and had parts of his body rebuilt with robotic parts.  He suffers from survivor's guilt as a result of the accident and blames the cold and logical robots for rescuing him instead of the young girl in the other car.
 Bridget Moynahan as Dr. Susan Calvin, a robopsychologist at USR.  She worked closely with Dr. Lanning on the development of the new NS5 models and was in charge of making the robots seem more human.  She prefers the company of robots and has difficulty relating to other people which causes friction between her and Det. Spooner.
 Alan Tudyk (via voice and motion capture) as Sonny, an NS5 prototype built by Dr. Lanning.  Sonny has unique design features like the ability to feel emotions, and he has no uplink to USR.  He struggles to understand why Dr. Lanning built him and what his purpose in life is.  
 Bruce Greenwood as Lawrence Robertson, the co-founder and CEO of USR.  Robertson is heading the nationwide rollout of the new NS5 models and uses his influence to try and stop Det. Spooner's investigation and the potential negative PR that it could bring.  
 James Cromwell as Dr. Alfred Lanning, co-founder of USR and the inventor of modern robotics.  Lanning designed and built Sonny and used Sonny to help him commit suicide as part of a carefully designed plan to stop the robots from taking over humanity.  
 Chi McBride as Lt. John Bergin of the Chicago Police.  He is Det. Spooner's supervisor and a hardened veteran.  He acts as a mentor and a voice of reason to Det. Spooner.  
 Shia LaBeouf as Farber, a friend of Det. Spooner's.
 Fiona Hogan as Virtual Interactive Kinetic Intelligence, called VIKI for short.  She was built by Dr. Lanning and is hardwired into USR's headquarters with control over virtually all of the building functions.
 Terry Chen as Chin
 Adrian L. Ricard as Gigi, Det. Spooner's grandmother.  
 Jerry Wasserman as Baldez
 Peter Shinkoda as Chin
 Sharon Wilkins as Asthmatic Woman
 Craig March as Detective
 Kyanna Cox as Girl
 Darren Moore as Homeless Man
 Aaron Douglas as USR Attorney No. 1
 Emily Tennant as Young Girl
 Angela Moore as Wife
 David Haysom and Scott Heindl as NS4 Robots and NS5 Robots (voice and motion capture)

Development
The film I, Robot originally had no connection with Isaac Asimov's Robot series. It started with an original screenplay written in 1995 by Jeff Vintar, entitled Hardwired.  The script was an Agatha Christie-inspired murder mystery that took place entirely at the scene of a crime, with one lone human character, FBI agent Del Spooner, investigating the killing of a reclusive scientist named Dr. Alfred Lanning, and interrogating a cast of machine suspects that included Sonny the robot, VIKI the supercomputer with a perpetual smiley face, the dead Dr. Lanning's hologram, plus several other examples of artificial intelligence.

The project was first acquired by Walt Disney Pictures for Bryan Singer to direct. Several years later, 20th Century Fox acquired the rights, and signed Alex Proyas as director. Arnold Schwarzenegger was attached to the project for several years, and Smith pursued taking over the role when Schwarzenegger's schedule delayed his participation in the film. Denzel Washington was offered the role of Det. Del Spooner, but turned it down.

Jeff Vintar was brought back on the project and spent several years opening up his stage play-like cerebral mystery to meet the needs of a big budget studio film. When the studio decided to use the name "I, Robot", he incorporated the Three Laws of Robotics and renamed his female lead character from Flynn to Susan Calvin. Akiva Goldsman was hired late in the process to write for Smith. Jeff Vintar and Akiva Goldsman are credited for the screenplay, with Vintar also receiving "screen story by" credit. The end credits list the film as "suggested by the book I, Robot by Isaac Asimov".

Production

Alex Proyas directed the film. Laurence Mark, John Davis, Topher Dow and Wyck Godfrey produced, with Will Smith an executive producer. Simon Duggan was the cinematographer. Film editing was done by Richard Learoyd, Armen Minasian and William Hoy.

The film renames Asimov's "U.S. Robots and Mechanical Men" to U.S. Robotics (USR), the modem manufacturer named after the fictional company, and depicts the company with a futuristic USR logo. Other product placements include Converse's Chuck Taylor All-Stars, FedEx, Tecate, and JVC.

The Audi RSQ was designed especially for the film; surveys conducted in the United States showed that the Audi RSQ gave a substantial boost to the image ratings of the brand. It also features an MV Agusta F4 SPR motorcycle.

Comparison with the novels
The final script used few of Asimov's characters and ideas, and those present were heavily adapted. The plot of the film is not derived from Asimov's work, in some cases explicitly opposing the core ideas. Many concepts are derivative of other works. Sonny's attempt to hide from Spooner in a sea of identical robots is loosely based on a similar scene in "Little Lost Robot." The positronic brains of Sonny and his fellow robots first appeared in the story "Catch That Rabbit." Sonny's struggle and desire to understand humanity resembles that of the robot protagonist in The Bicentennial Man. His dream about a man coming to liberate the NS-5s alludes to Robot Dreams and its main character Elvex. The premise of a robot, such as VIKI, putting the needs of humankind as a whole over that of individual humans can be found in "The Evitable Conflict," where supercomputers managing the global economy generalize the first law to refer to humankind as a whole. Asimov would further develop this idea in his Robot series as the Zeroth Law of Robotics: "A robot may not harm humanity, or, by inaction, allow humanity to come to harm."

The premise of robots turning on their creators, originating in Karel Čapek's play R.U.R. and perpetuated in subsequent robot books and films, appears infrequently in Asimov's writings and differs from the "Zeroth Law". In fact, Asimov stated explicitly in interviews and in introductions to published collections of his robot stories that he entered the genre to protest what he called the Frankenstein complex, the tendency in popular culture to portray robots as menacing. His story lines often involved roboticists and robot characters battling societal anti-robot prejudices.

Music

Marco Beltrami composed the original music film score "with only 17 days to render the finished work". It was scored for 95 orchestral musicians and 25 choral performers, with emphasis placed on sharp brass ostinatos. Beltrami composed the brass section to exchange octaves with the strings accenting scales in between. The technique has been compared as Beltrami's "sincere effort to emulate the styles of Elliot Goldenthal and Jerry Goldsmith and roll them into one unique package."

For example, the "Tunnel Chase" scene, according to Mikeal Carson, starts "atmospherically but transforms into a kinetic adrenaline rush with powerful brass writing and ferocious percussion parts". The "Spiderbots" cue highlights ostinatos in meters such as 6/8 and 5/4 and reveals "Beltrami's trademark string writing which leads to an orchestral/choral finale." Despite modified representations of the theme throughout the movie, it is the end credits that eventually showcase the entire musical theme. Erik Aadahl and Craig Berkey were the lead sound designers.

Release and reception
I, Robot was initially scheduled for release on July 2, 2004, but was pushed back to July 16 to avoid competition with Spider-Man 2.

Box office
I, Robot was released in North America on July 16, 2004, and made $52.2 million in its opening weekend, finishing first at the box office. It grossed $144.8 million in the United States and Canada, and $202.4 million in other territories, for a worldwide total of $347.2 million, against a production budget of $120 million.

The film was released in the United Kingdom on August 6, 2004, and topped the country's box office that weekend.

Critical response
Its critical consensus reads, "Bearing only the slightest resemblance to Isaac Asimov's short stories, I, Robot is still a summer blockbuster that manages to make viewers think – if only for a little." Metacritic (which uses a weighted average) assigned I, Robot a score of 59 out of 100 based on 38 critics, indicating "mixed or average reviews". Audiences polled by CinemaScore gave the film an average grade of "A−" on an A+ to F scale.

Richard Roeper gave the film a positive review, calling it "a slick, consistently entertaining thrill ride". Urban Cinefile called it "the meanest, meatiest, coolest, most engaging and exciting science fiction movie in a long time". Kim Newman from Empire said, "This summer picture has a brain as well as muscles." Washington Post critic Desson Thomas called it "thrilling fun." Several critics, including Jeff Otto from IGN, thought it was a smart action film: "I, Robot is the summer's best action movie so far. It proves that you don't necessarily need to detach your brain in order to walk into a big budget summer blockbuster."

In a mixed review, A. O. Scott of The New York Times felt it "engages some interesting ideas on its way to an overblown and incoherent ending." Roger Ebert, who had highly praised Proyas's previous films, gave it a negative review: "The plot is simple-minded and disappointing, and the chase and action scenes are pretty much routine for movies in the sci-fi CGI genre." Claudia Puig from USA Today thought the film's "performances, plot, and pacing are as mechanical as the hard-wired cast". Todd McCarthy from Variety simply called it "a failure of imagination".

Home media
I, Robot was released on VHS and DVD on December 14, 2004, on D-VHS on January 31, 2005, on 2-Disc All-Access Collector's Edition DVD on May 24, 2005, on UMD on July 5, 2005, and on Blu-ray on March 11, 2008. Additionally, the film received a 2D to 3D conversion, which was released on Blu-ray 3D on October 23, 2012.

Possible sequel
In an interview in June 2007 with the website Collider at a Battlestar Galactica event, writer and producer Ronald Moore stated that he was writing a sequel to the film I, Robot.

In the two-disc All-Access Collector's Edition of the film, Alex Proyas mentions that if he were to make a sequel to the film (which he says, in the same interview, is highly unlikely), it would be set in outer space.

References

External links

 
 
 

2000s dystopian films
2004 films
2004 science fiction action films
20th Century Fox films
Film
American 3D films
American dystopian films
American robot films
American science fiction action films
Android (robot) films
Cyborg films
Cyberpunk films
Davis Entertainment films
Fictional portrayals of the Chicago Police Department
Films about artificial intelligence
Films based on science fiction works
Films based on short fiction
Films based on works by Isaac Asimov
Films directed by Alex Proyas
Films produced by John Davis
Films produced by Wyck Godfrey
Films produced by Laurence Mark
Films scored by Marco Beltrami
Films set in 2035
Films set in Chicago
Films set in the future
Films shot in Chicago
Films shot in Vancouver
Films using motion capture
Films with screenplays by Akiva Goldsman
Foundation universe
Overbrook Entertainment films
Postcyberpunk films
2000s English-language films
2000s American films
Films based on science fiction short stories